Joseph Francis Connor (December 8, 1874 – November 8, 1957) was an American right-handed Major League Baseball catcher.

Major league career
Joe Connor made his major league debut with the St. Louis Browns at Robison Field on September 9, 1895, and spent the 1895 season playing alongside his brother, Roger Connor. At the end his rookie season, Connor didn't play major league baseball again for five years, when he was released from the St. Louis Browns in 1900. Before the 1901 season, Connor played for the Boston Beaneaters. Connor also played for the Milwaukee Brewers in the 1901 season.  On July 22, 1901, Connor was released by the Milwaukee Brewers. Only four days later, on July 26, he signed as a free agent with the Cleveland Blues. In 1905, he played his last season of major league baseball. In September 1905, the Cleveland Blues loaned Connor to the New York Highlanders. Conner played his final Major League Baseball game on October 7, 1905.

After retirement
Joe Connor died on November 8, 1957, in Waterbury, Connecticut. Combinations of major league brothers have only happened about 350 times. His brother was called the 19th century's home run king, and he was the first Major League Baseball player to hit an over-the-wall home run at the Polo Grounds baseball stadium.

References

External links

Baseball Almanac

1874 births
1957 deaths
Baseball players from Connecticut
Major League Baseball catchers
St. Louis Browns (NL) players
Boston Beaneaters players
Cleveland Blues (1901) players
New York Highlanders players
Milwaukee Brewers (1901) players
Sportspeople from Waterbury, Connecticut
Minor league baseball managers
Augusta Kennebecs players
Bangor Millionaires players
Troy Trojans (minor league) players
Waterbury Indians players
Fall River Indians players
Waterbury Pirates players
Waterbury Rough Riders players
Bridgeport Orators players
Springfield Ponies players
Newark Sailors players
Montreal Royals players
New Britain Perfectos players
19th-century baseball players